Mighty Lak a Goat is a 1942 Our Gang short comedy film directed by Herbert Glazer. It was the 209th Our Gang short (210th episode, 121st talking short, 122nd talking episode, and 41st MGM produced episode) that was released. The title is a reference to the 1901 song, "Mighty Lak' a Rose".

Plot
The gang tries to clean off their clothes after being splattered with mud accidentally by a passing motorist. A unique cleaning solution devised by Froggy works beautifully, but with one major drawback: The stuff has a terribly pungent odor. Froggy tells the gang that they would get used to the smell. They do get used to the bad odor to the point of being oblivious to it. The kids manage to empty out a bus trying to board it.

They walk to school and get thrown out of the classroom due to their smell. Then, being free from school, the gang goes to see a movie called Don't Open That Door at the theater. The movie-house cashier notices their smell, but they head into the auditorium. Then even the actors on the screen cannot stand the smell and stop performing. They finally get removed from the theater and remove their clothes behind a tree.

Cast

The Gang
 Bobby Blake as Mickey
 Billy Laughlin as Froggy
 George McFarland as Spanky
 Billie Thomas as Buckwheat

Additional cast
 John Dilson as Banker Stone
 George B. French as Patron
 Ava Gardner as Girl at the theatre box office
 Robert Emmett O'Connor as Detective King
 Anne O'Neal as Schoolteacher
 William Tannen as Bus driver
 Joe Yule Sr. as Patron
 Lee Phelps as Police officer
 Charlie Sullivan as Bus passenger

Production notes
Ava Gardner plays the role of the cashier at the film theater. According to Robert Blake, Mickey Rooney, who was married to Gardner at the time, came in to direct her one scene. Rooney's father, Joe Yule, Sr. has a cameo as a movie patron.
The film they see is called Don't Open That Door. The scene in the movie shown on this film starred Robert Emmet O'Connor, Banker Stone and John Dilson.

See also
 Our Gang filmography

References

External links

1942 films
1942 comedy films
American black-and-white films
Films directed by Herbert Glazer
Metro-Goldwyn-Mayer short films
Our Gang films
1940s American films